A list of films produced in Pakistan in 1987 (see 1987 in film) and in the Urdu language:

1987

See also
1987 in Pakistan

External links
 Search Pakistani film - IMDB.com

1987
Lists of 1987 films by country or language
Films